, lit. Tomb of the Unknown Soldier of the World, is a cenotaph in Ogose, Saitama Japan.

General 
The cenotaph houses 264 remains and commemorated the souls of Japanese and the 2.51 million souls of dead soldiers from more than 60 countries during World War II. A memorial service, Shichi-Go-San parade, garden plant market and fireworks are held on the second Saturday or Sunday of May annually.

See also 
 Chidorigafuchi National Cemetery
 Ryozen Kannon

External links 
 The memorial service of Sekai Mumei Senshi no Haka (世界無名戦士之墓慰霊大祭) Ogose, Saitama Home page (in Japanese)

Cemeteries in Japan
World War II memorials in Japan
Buildings and structures in Saitama Prefecture
Cenotaphs in Japan
Tourist attractions in Saitama Prefecture
Tombs of Unknown Soldiers